An  bronze statue of Abraham Lincoln is installed in Lytle Park within downtown Cincinnati, Ohio, United States.

The Charles P. Taft family commissioned artist George Grey Barnard to complete a statue in commemoration of the centenary of Lincoln's birth. The sculpture was unveiled at Lytle Park on March 31, 1917.  Former U.S. President William Howard Taft, the younger brother of Charles, delivered the dedication speech.

Two more castings of Barnard's statue exist, one in Louisville, Kentucky, and one in Manchester, England.

See also
List of statues of Abraham Lincoln
Piatt Park, downtown park with bronze statues of William Henry Harrison and James Garfield
List of sculptures of presidents of the United States

References

Sculptures by George Grey Barnard
Cincinnati
Bronze sculptures in Ohio
Outdoor sculptures in Cincinnati
1917 sculptures
Statues in Cincinnati
1917 establishments in Ohio
Sculptures of men in Ohio
Monuments and memorials to Abraham Lincoln in the United States
Buildings and monuments honouring American presidents in the United Kingdom